is a railway station on the Kyūdai Main Line operated by JR Kyushu in Kusu, Ōita Prefecture, Japan.

Lines

Layout 
The station, which is unstaffed, consists of a side platform platform a single track on a side hill cutting overlooking the main road and a river valley with a waterfall visible from the station. The station building is a modern timber structure built to resemble a mountain cabin. The waiting area for passengers is located on the ground floor while the upper floor is used by a local tourism association which maintains an exhibition in the station premises. From the station building, a short flight of steps leads up to the platform. A bike shed is provided outside the station building.

Adjacent stations

History
The Daito Railway was nationalized on 1 December 1922, after which Japanese Government Railways (JGR) undertook phased westward expansion of the track which, at the time, it had designated as the Daito Line. By 1929, the track had reached . Subsequently, the track was extended further west and Kita-Yamada was opened as the new western terminus on 16 September 1932. On 15 November 1934, when the Daito Line had linked up with the Kyudai Main Line further west, JGR designated the station as part of the Kyudai Main Line. With the privatization of Japanese National Railways (JNR), the successor of JGR, on 1 April 1987, the station came under the control of JR Kyushu.

Passenger statistics
In fiscal 2015, there were a total of 14,884 boarding passengers, giving a daily average of 41 passengers.

See also
 List of railway stations in Japan

References

External links
Kita-Yamada (JR Kyushu)

Railway stations in Ōita Prefecture
Railway stations in Japan opened in 1932